John A. Swets (19 June 1928 – 6 July 2016) was a psychologist. He played a key role in the adaptation of signal detection theory first to the psychology of perception and later as a central tool in medical diagnostics. He was a member of the National Academy of Sciences.

References

Further reading 

John A. Swets: Tulips to Thresholds. Peninsula Publishing, Los Altos Hills, California. 2010.

1928 births
2016 deaths
People from Grand Rapids, Michigan
20th-century American psychologists